Richland Springs is a town located in San Saba County. The population was 338 in 2010.

History
Richland Springs developed in the nineteenth century as a supply and processing center for local cotton growers and cattlemen. Jackson J. Brown and his family settled near the springs on Richland Springs Creek (then known as Richland Creek) in December 1854 and were soon followed by the Tankersley and Duncan families. A private fort, Fort Duncan, was established near the springs in the late 1850s when trouble arose with Indians on the frontier, but it apparently fell into disuse shortly thereafter. The Brown School was constructed in 1868 and named for the neighborhood's original settler. The area attracted settlers through the 1870s, and in 1877 a Richland Springs post office opened in the store of Samuel E. Hays. The community took its name from the nearby springs and from local enthusiasm for the agricultural promise of the region. By 1890 local production of cotton, grains, and livestock supported a settlement of 150 residents, including a justice of the peace precinct, a constabulary, and several commercial and craft businesses. A local newspaper, the Eye-Witness, began publication in 1905. Not long after, the First State Bank was organized, and in 1911 completion of a trunk line for the Gulf, Colorado and Santa Fe Railway linked the town with the main line between Galveston and Amarillo. Richland Springs incorporated in 1932 and adopted a mayor-council form of city government. With a population nearing 500 and as many as forty businesses, the town prospered until the onset of the Great Depression. World War II reversed the decline of the 1930s, and by the early 1950s residents numbered 600. The number of businesses still had not returned to predepression levels when a three-year drought in the mid-1950s crippled the local economy again. The town's only bank failed, and within a decade its residential and business populations had fallen by nearly half. An uneven recovery from the nadir of the 1960s was based on the production of local fruit and nut growers. In 1982 the town reported 420 residents and five businesses; by 1986 the number of businesses had risen to eight. In 1990 the population was 344. The population was 350 in 2000.

Geography

Richland Springs is located at  (31.270326, –98.945654).

According to the United States Census Bureau, the town has a total area of 1.0 square miles (2.6 km2), all of it land.

Climate

The climate in this area is characterized by hot, humid summers and generally mild to cool winters.  According to the Köppen climate classification system, Richland Springs has a humid subtropical climate, Cfa on climate maps.

Demographics

As of the census of 2000, 350 people, 147 households, and 99 families resided in the town. The population density was 348.6 people per square mile (135.1/km2). The 182 housing units averaged 181.3 per square mile (70.3/km2). The racial makeup of the town was 96.00% White, 0.29% African American, 0.86% Native American, 1.71% from other races, and 1.14% from two or more races. Hispanics or Latinos of any race were 14.29% of the population.

Of the 147 households, 32.7% had children under the age of 18 living with them, 53.1% were married couples living together, 8.8% had a female householder with no husband present, and 32.0% were not families. About 31.3% of all households were made up of individuals, and 19.7% had someone living alone who was 65 years of age or older. The average household size was 2.38 and the average family size was 2.94.

The population was distributed as 27.1% under the age of 18, 6.6% from 18 to 24, 23.4% from 25 to 44, 20.6% from 45 to 64, and 22.3% who were 65 years of age or older. The median age was 39 years. For every 100 females, there were 107.1 males. For every 100 females age 18 and over, there were 97.7 males.

The median income for a household in the town was $28,750, and for a family was $40,357. Males had a median income of $26,875 versus $18,750 for females. The per capita income for the town was $15,691. About 9.1% of families and 14.0% of the population were below the poverty line, including 27.3% of those under age 18 and 4.7% of those age 65 or over.

Education
The Town of Richland Springs is served by the Richland Springs Independent School District.  The district has one campus, Richland Springs ISD, that serves students in grades kindergarten through 12.

The Richland Springs Coyotes have appeared in 10 Texas state six-man football championships and have won nine of them (2004, 2006, 2007, 2010, 2011, 2012, 2015, 2016, 2019).

References 

Towns in San Saba County, Texas
Towns in Texas